Noblett, Noblette, or Noblitt may refer to:

William Noblett (born 1953), an Anglican priest and author
Noblett Creek, a stream in the U.S. state of Missouri
77856 Noblitt, a minor planet
Irene Noblett (1902–1973, also Noblitt or Noblette) or Irene Ryan, an American actress